Brian B. Boutwell is an American criminologist and Associate Professor of Criminal Justice & Legal Studies at the University of Mississippi.

Career 
Boutwell has conducted research on the intelligence quotient of psychopaths, finding that their average IQ is lower than the general population. This research has been published in a peer-reviewed journal. He has been an associate professor at the University of Mississippi since the summer of 2019.

Boutwell has written articles for Quillette on the subject of "human biodiversity" (HBD).

References

External links
Faculty page

Living people
American criminologists
Saint Louis University faculty
Sam Houston State University faculty
Florida State University alumni
Year of birth missing (living people)